The Northern University (NU) is a private non profit university funded by EDR Trust, located in Nowshera Cantonment, Khyber Pakhtunkhwa.
The inauguration of the university was done by the President of Northern University General (R) Sawar Khan.
Its main campus is located at Wattar Walai Ziarat, Kaka Sahib Road,  Nowshera

Academic programs

Faculty of Engineering and Information Technology
It offers undergraduate programs in the fields of Electrical Engineering, Computer Science, Information Technology, and Electronics and postgraduate degrees in the field of Electronics, Computer Science and Information Technology.

Faculty of Administrative Sciences
The Faculty of Administrative Sciences offers undergraduate and graduate programs in Business Administration with a focus on core strategies in management and international business.

Faculty of Arts and Social Sciences
It offers four year undergraduate programs in Textile and Fashion Designing and Home Economics and postgraduate degrees in Economics, Education, English, Urdu and Journalism.

Faculty of Sciences
It is offering MSc degree in Mathematics and Environmental Science and MPhil degree in Environmental Science.

Campuses
The university had two campuses; however, after successfully completion of a asphalted road and state of the art security arrangements, it has shifted to one Main Campus. Main campus is located at Wattar Walai Ziarat Kaka Sahib Road, Nowshera.
The foundation stone for the main block was laid by Mr. Khalil Ur Rehman, Governor NWFP in April 2005.

Gallery

References

External links
NU official website

Pakistan Army universities and colleges
Universities and colleges in Nowshera District
Educational institutions established in 2002
2002 establishments in Pakistan
Private universities and colleges in Pakistan